(name in Northern Portugal and Brazil (literally "codfish cakes") or  (name in Central and Southern Portugal, and in PALOP (literally "codfish pastries") are typically made from a mixture of potatoes, bacalhau (codfish), eggs, parsley, onion and sometimes a hint of nutmeg. Ideally, they should be slightly crunchy on the outside and soft and creamy on the inside.

It is called accras de morue in French Antilles.

References 

Portuguese cuisine
Fish dishes